David XI or Dāwūd Khan II (died c. 1579) was King of Kartli. A convert to Islam, he was appointed as Khan of Kartli by the Persian Shah Tahmasp I from 1562 (effectively from 1569) to 1578.

Life
David was a brother of the Kartlian king Simon I, who led a long-lasting liberation war against the Safavid Persian and Ottoman empires. In December 1561, David repaired to Qazvin to offer his submission to Shah Tahmasp, converted to Islam and adopted the name of Daud Khan. The shah appointed him ruler in Kartli, elevated him to the rank of farzand ("son") at his investiture, and sent with a Persian army to claim the power. He may have been an unnamed Georgian prince reported by the English explorer Anthony Jenkinson as attending his audience with Shah Tahmasp on 20 November 1562, but Daud appears to have been returned to Georgia in August 1562 and the Georgian prince of Jenkinson's report could have been another Georgian renegade, Prince Jesse of Kakheti (Isa Khan). 

Relying on the Persian occupation forces and a few loyal nobles, Daud was in control of the Georgian capital Tbilisi and the province of Lower Kartli, while the rest of the kingdom remained faithful to Simon. The rival brothers met on the battlefield on several occasions. The hostilities took place mainly around Tbilisi, which was blockaded by Simon’s forces from 1567 to 1569. Although the king won the battles at Dighomi (1567) and Samadlo (1569), the Persians eventually prevailed and took Simon captive at the Battle of Partskhisi, 1569. He was sent in chains to the fortress of Alamut, and Daud Khan assumed nominal control of all of Kartli. As previously, he relied on the Persians and paid an annual tribute to the Shah. A patriotic alliance of nobles led by Prince Sachino Baratashvili continued, however, resistance to the renegade Georgian ruler. In 1578, a peace between the Safavids and the Ottomans collapsed. The Turkish army commanded by Lala Mustafa Pasha overran much of Georgia and dislodged Daud Khan, who had burnt the citadel of Tbilisi and taken shelter at Lorri. The Shah presently freed Simon to fight against the Ottomans and reinstated him as king of Kartli. In retaliation, Daud Khan handed the control over Lorri to the Turks and fled to Istanbul, where he was welcomed and granted lordship over two sanjaks. His sons, Bagrat and Khosro, took shelter in Persia. During his stay in Turkey, Daud Khan compiled two Ottoman-era medical treatises (qarabadin) and translated it into Georgian, sending a copy to his motherland.

Family
David was married to Elene, a relative of King Alexander II of Kakheti. They had the following children:
Bagrat VII, King of Kartli
A daughter, married Prince Asanbeg (Kaikhosro) Baratashvili (fl. 1599–1620)
A daughter, married Baindur (Baadur), Duke of Aragvi
A daughter, married Prince Adam-Sultan Andronikashvili. Their daughter, Tamar, married Luarsab, heir-apparent of Kartli. 

By a concubine, a peasant woman from Tsavkisi, David had a natural son:
Rostom, King of Kartli

References

Sources
 
 

1579 deaths
16th-century people from Georgia (country)
Bagrationi dynasty of the Kingdom of Kartli
Converts to Shia Islam from Eastern Orthodoxy
Former Georgian Orthodox Christians
Shia Muslims from Georgia (country)
Safavid appointed kings of Kartli
Year of birth unknown
Safavid generals
16th-century people of Safavid Iran